Gooseberry Island was a settlement of about nine families in 1864 in the Bonavista Bay area. The first Waymaster was Charles Harris but the Way Office closed in 1873. It reopened in 1882 at which time it became a Post Office and the first Postmaster was Ambrose Janes.

See also
List of communities in Newfoundland and Labrador
List of people of Newfoundland and Labrador

Ghost towns in Newfoundland and Labrador